Jorge Luis Burruchaga (born 9 October 1962), nicknamed Burru, is an Argentine association football coach and former professional football player. He played both as an attacking midfielder and forward and scored the winning goal in the final of the 1986 FIFA World Cup.

Club career
Born in Gualeguay, Entre Ríos, Burruchaga started playing in 1980 for Arsenal de Sarandí in Argentina's then second division.

He contracted with Independiente in 1982 and debuted in a victory against Estudiantes de La Plata on 12 February. He was part of the team that won the Metropolitano 1983, the Copa Libertadores and the Intercontinental Cup in 1984.

He was then transferred to French team Nantes, where he played for seven years. He also played one year for Valenciennes, where he was involved in a bribing scandal involving the French and European champions Olympique de Marseille 'buying' a 1–0 league win at Valenciennes on 20 May 1993. Marseille midfield player Jean-Jacques Eydelie and the club's general manager, Jean-Pierre Bernès, had offered him money to throw the game, Burruchaga said he agreed but then changed his mind. He was subsequently given a suspended six-month jail sentence when judgment was delivered on 15 May 1995.

He returned to Argentina for his last spell in Independiente, when he won a Supercopa Sudamericana and a Recopa Sudamericana both in 1995.

He retired from professional football on 10 April 1998 in a match against Vélez Sársfield.

International career
Burruchaga was part of the Argentina squad that won the 1986 FIFA World Cup, scoring two goals, including the goal that gave Argentina the 3–2 victory against West Germany in the final match. He also participated in all Argentine matches at the 1990 FIFA World Cup and scored one goal in the tournament. He scored a total of 13 goals for Argentina in 59 games between 1983 and 1990.

Managerial career
Burruchaga coached Arsenal de Sarandí since its arrival to first division in 2002, and succeeded in keeping the team far from the bottom of the standings. For the 2005–06 season, he signed with Estudiantes de La Plata. In May 2006, he moved to Independiente and resigned in April 2007. He has also managed Banfield from 2008 to 2009

On 5 May 2009, Burruchaga returned to Arsenal de Sarandí but resigned in 2010. He managed Paraguayan Club Libertad since 2011. He managed Atletico Rafaela in the Argentinian Primera Division from 2012 to June 2014. In 2015, Burruchaga returned to Rafaela in his second period as a coach.

At the 2018 FIFA World Cup, Burruchaga served as Argentina national football team's general manager.

Personal life
In 1995, his wife Laura Mendoza died from the injuries sustained in a car crash. Burruchaga is father of the footballer Mauro Burruchaga and aspiring tennis player Román Burruchaga.

Career statistics

Club

International

Honours

Club
Independiente
 Primera División: 1983 Metropolitano
 Copa Libertadores: 1984
 Intercontinental Cup: 1984
 Supercopa Sudamericana: 1995
 Recopa Sudamericana: 1995

International
Argentina
 FIFA World Cup: 1986

Individual
 Copa América Top Scorer: 1983
 French Division 1 Foreign Player of the Year: 1985–86

References

External links
Official Twitter
Burruchaga: The longest, most exhilarating run of my life FIFA.com

 
 
  

1962 births
Living people
Argentine footballers
Argentine people of Basque descent
People from Gualeguay Department
Association football midfielders
Association football forwards
Arsenal de Sarandí footballers
Club Atlético Independiente footballers
FC Nantes players
Valenciennes FC players
Expatriate footballers in France
Argentina youth international footballers
Argentina under-20 international footballers
Argentina international footballers
1986 FIFA World Cup players
1990 FIFA World Cup players
1983 Copa América players
1989 Copa América players
Copa Libertadores-winning players
FIFA World Cup-winning players
Argentine football managers
Arsenal de Sarandí managers
Estudiantes de La Plata managers
Club Atlético Independiente managers
Club Atlético Banfield managers
Atlético de Rafaela managers
Argentine expatriate footballers
Argentine Primera División players
Ligue 1 players
Argentine expatriate sportspeople in France
Club Libertad managers
Association football controversies
Argentine expatriate sportspeople in Paraguay
Expatriate football managers in Paraguay
Sportspeople from Entre Ríos Province